Rettai Vaal Kuruvi is a 1987 Indian Tamil-language romantic comedy film, starring Mohan, Raadhika and Archana. It is based on the 1984 American film Micki & Maude. The film was released on 27 February 1987.

Plot 

The story sets back to the vintage Madras Presidency. Gopi works in the National TV Station under his handler, a confidant and good friend Margabandhu. Though Gopi has already been married to Thulasi, the rightful daughter of his aunt, he finds love in Radha, who is a reputed singer. Gopi swaps between the two consorts, and the film sets in a mood of hilarious, romantic journey. This goes on until it ends up in admitting both of the wives at a same hospital due to different reasons. He manages to cover up his secret love to be known from each other, which fails in the end. Finally, the film ends on a happy note sharing the lives between the trio and two beautiful little kids.

Cast 
 Mohan as Gopi
 Archana as Tulasi
 Raadhika as Radha
 V. K. Ramasamy as S. Marga Bandhu
 Thengai Srinivasan as T. S. Vassan, Tulasi's father
 Senthamarai as T. S. Arumugham, Tulasi's paternal uncle
Ilaiyaraaja as himself

Soundtrack 
The music was composed by Ilaiyaraaja. The song "Kannan Vanthu" is set in the Carnatic raga known as Natabhairavi. while "Raja Raja Chozhan" is set in Keeravani. This song involves a "switch from 12/8 to shuffle". For the dubbed Telugu version Rendu Thokala Pitta, all songs were written by Rajasri.

Release and reception 
Rettai Vaal Kuruvi was released on 27 February 1987. N. Krishnaswamy of The Indian Express wrote, "Mohan, Archana and Radhika carry themselves with ease. Balu's photography, as usual, is marked by chiaroscuro, play of light and shade."

Notes

References

Bibliography

External links 

1987 romantic comedy films
1980s Tamil-language films
1987 films
Films directed by Balu Mahendra
Films scored by Ilaiyaraaja
Indian romantic comedy films
Polygamy in fiction